The Blown Away Tour was the third headlining tour by American country music singer Carrie Underwood, in support of her fourth studio album Blown Away. This was Underwood's first worldwide tour, with the singer performing in both Europe and Australia for the first time.

Underwood announced that she would be donating $1 from each ticket sold on the tour's North American leg to support Red Cross disaster relief.

The Blown Away Tour was the 47th best-selling tour in the world in 2012, having earned $29.2 million with sold 486,504 tickets. In 2013, it was the 31st best-selling tour, mid-year, with $23.6 million and 386,695 tickets sold. Overall, the tour grossed $52.8 million, one of Underwood's highest-grossing.

Background
On May 1, 2012, Underwood announced the Blown Away Tour. The tour included an international run of shows during the summer of 2012, including her first-ever United Kingdom concert, taking place at the prestigious Royal Albert Hall in London on June 21. Underwood announced four dates in Australia on May 6, 2012. Opening for Underwood was country singer Hunter Hayes, who was the opening act for the North American leg of the tour. On October 29, 2012, dates for the second North American leg of the tour were announced. On November 30, 2012, it was announced that Underwood would be taking the tour to Ireland and Northern Ireland in March 2013. They were Underwood's first-ever concerts in Ireland and Northern Ireland.

Opening acts
Damien Leith 
Hunter Hayes 
Kira Isabella

Set list
{{hidden
| headercss = background: #ccccff; font-size: 100%; width: 65%;
| contentcss = text-align: left; font-size: 100%; width: 75%;
| header = Europe and Oceania
| content =

 "Good Girl"
 "Flat on the Floor"
 "Wasted"
 "Two Black Cadillacs"
 "So Small"
 "Temporary Home"
 "Last Name" 
 "Just a Dream"
 "I Told You So"
 "Leave Love Alone"
 "Cowboy Casanova"
 "Nobody Ever Told You"
 "Quitter"
 "Do You Think About Me"
 "One Way Ticket"
 "Undo It"
 "Fix You" 
 "Jesus, Take the Wheel" / "How Great Thou Art"
 "Cupid's Got a Shotgun"
 "Before He Cheats"
Encore
 "I Know You Won't"
 "Blown Away"

}}
{{hidden
| headercss = background: #ccccff; font-size: 100%; width: 65%;
| contentcss = text-align: left; font-size: 100%; width: 75%;
| header = North America
| content =

 "Good Girl"
 "Undo It"
 "Wasted"
 "I Told You So"
 "Two Black Cadillacs"
 "Last Name"
 "All-American Girl" 
 "Temporary Home"
 "Jesus, Take the Wheel"
 "Cowboy Casanova"
 "Get Out of This Town"
 "Nobody Ever Told You" 
 "Thank God For Hometowns"
 "Crazy Dreams"
 "Do You Think About Me"
 "One Way Ticket"
 "Leave Love Alone" 
 "Sweet Emotion"
 "Remind Me"
 "Cupid's Got a Shotgun"
 "Before He Cheats"
Encore
"I Know You Won't"
 "Blown Away"

}}

Tour dates

List of festivals and rescheduled shows

Rescheduled shows

Awards and nominations

Tour DVD
A concert DVD entitled The Blown Away Tour: Live was released on August 12, 2013, in the United Kingdom, August 13, 2013 in North America and on August 16, 2013, in Australia. The footage was captured during Underwood's concert in Ontario, California on March 3, 2013. The DVD includes more than twenty songs performed by Underwood on tour, as well as exclusive interviews with Underwood, tour director of The Blown Away Tour, Raj Kapoor, and other behind-the-scenes footage about the tour.

Tour exhibition
From June 5, 2013, to November 10, 2013, the Country Music Hall of Fame and Museum displayed The Blown Away Tour Exhibit for visitors in Nashville, Tennessee. The exhibit featured costumes, set pieces, microphones, and other novelties from the tour.

References

2012 concert tours
2013 concert tours
Carrie Underwood concert tours